David Lamar Williams (born June 10, 1963) is a former American football wide receiver.  Williams was named consensus All-American twice at the University of Illinois, and is an inducted member of the College Football Hall of Fame as well as the Canadian Football Hall of Fame .

Williams was inducted into the College Football Hall of Fame in 2005.

Williams attended Serra High School in Gardena, California.  Williams attended Los Angeles Harbor College where he was a junior college All-American.

University of Illinois

Career at Illinois
Williams played at Illinois from 1983 to 1985.  Under the prolific passing offense of coach Mike White, Williams set many Illinois receiving records, and was a consensus two-time First-team All-American.

In Williams' first season, the 1983 Fighting Illini finished the regular season with a record of 10-1, including a 9-0 mark in Big Ten games.  Williams caught 59 passes for 870 yards, with six touchdowns. As Big Ten champions, the Fighting Illini played UCLA in the 1984 Rose Bowl.  Williams caught 10 passes for 88 yards in a 45-9 loss.

In 1984, Williams led all NCAA Division I receivers with 101 receptions, 1278 receiving yards, and 9.2 receptions per game. His 101 receptions made Williams the second player in NCAA history to have more than 100 receptions in a season. Williams was a consensus First-team All-American

Williams was again a consensus First-team All-American in 1985. He caught 85 passes for 1047 yards and had eight touchdown receptions in the regular season. Illinois played Army in the 1985 Peach Bowl, and Williams caught seven passes for 109 yards, including touchdown catches of 15 and 54 yards, although Illinois lost by the score of 31-29.

Williams finished his collegiate career as the second leading receiver in NCAA history. In 1990, Williams was named to Illinois' 25-man All-Century Team, chosen as part of the celebration of 100 years of Illinois football.

Trivia
 Williams is one of three brothers to have played wide receiver at the University of Illinois; along with his brothers Oliver Williams and Steven Williams. 
 Williams' position coach at Illinois was future NFL head coach Brad Childress.

Awards and recognitions
 1984 First-team All-American by the Associated Press, UPI, American Football Coaches Association, Football Writers Association of America, the Walter Camp Foundation, the Sporting News, and Football News
 1985 First-team All-American by the Associated Press, UPI, American Football Coaches Association, Football Writers Association of America, the Walter Camp Foundation, and the Sporting News
 1983 Second-team All-Big Ten by the AP and UPI
 1984 First-team All-Big Ten by the AP and UPI
 1985 First-team All-Big Ten by the AP and UPI
 1984 Illinois Team MVP
 1985 Illinois Team MVP

Illinois records
As of 2005 Illinois Football Media Guide
 Most receptions, one game: 16,  vs Purdue, October 12, 1985
 Most receptions, season: 101, 1984
 Most receptions, career: 262
 Most receiving yards, season: 1278, 1984
 Most receiving yards, career: 3392
 Most touchdown receptions, season: 10, 1985
 Most touchdown receptions, career: 24
 Most 100-receiving yard games, season: 6, 1984 & 1985 (shared with Brandon Lloyd)
 Most 100-receiving yard games, career: 16
 Most receptions, bowl game: 10, vs UCLA, 1984 Rose Bowl

NCAA Division I all-time rankings
As of 2005 NCAA Division I Football Record Book
 Career receptions per game: 10th, 7.4
 Season receptions per game: 21st, 9.2, 1984
 Career receptions: 21st, 245
 Season receptions: 24th, 101, 1984

Note: the NCAA does not recognize postseason statistics prior to 2002 in the official records.

Illinois statistics
Including bowl games

National Football League
Williams was taken in the third round of the 1986 NFL Draft by the Chicago Bears, with the 82nd overall selection. He has the rare distinction of being a 3rd round pick who was cut before the season started. Williams would play two seasons in the National Football League, but would never be able to duplicate his collegiate success in the NFL. Williams played for the Tampa Bay Buccaneers in 1986 and the Los Angeles Raiders in 1987, and would finish his NFL career with 10 catches for 195 yards.

Canadian Football League
Williams played seven seasons in the Canadian Football League. He played for the BC Lions in 1988 and 1989, the Ottawa Rough Riders in 1990, the Edmonton Eskimos in 1991, the Toronto Argonauts in 1991 and 1992 and the Winnipeg Blue Bombers from 1993 to 1995. He won the CFL's Outstanding Player Award in 1988, and played in the classic 76th Grey Cup game in 1988, scoring one touchdown. He won a Grey Cup title for the Toronto Argonauts in 1991.

Williams was inducted into the Canadian Football Hall of Fame in 2019.

References

External links
 

1963 births
Living people
All-American college football players
American football wide receivers
American players of Canadian football
BC Lions players
Canadian Football League Most Outstanding Player Award winners
Canadian football wide receivers
Chicago Bears players
College Football Hall of Fame inductees
Edmonton Elks players
Illinois Fighting Illini football players
Los Angeles Harbor Seahawks football players
Los Angeles Raiders players
Ottawa Rough Riders players
Players of American football from Los Angeles
People from Gardena, California
Tampa Bay Buccaneers players
Toronto Argonauts players
Winnipeg Blue Bombers players
National Football League replacement players
Players of Canadian football from Los Angeles